Donald Stewart was a member of the Wisconsin State Assembly during the 1882 and 1883 sessions. He was a Republican. Stewart was born on June 5, 1825, in York, New York.

References

People from York, New York
People from Sugar Creek, Wisconsin
People from Waukesha County, Wisconsin
Republican Party members of the Wisconsin State Assembly
1825 births
Year of death missing